This is a list of notable people affiliated with Nuffield College, University of Oxford, England. It includes former students, current and former academics and fellows. When available, year of matriculation is provided in parentheses, as listed in the Oxford Dictionary of National Biography.

Former students

Politicians and public officials 
 Alan Beith, Baron Beith, Deputy Leader of the Liberal Democrats, 1992–2003
 Richard Bruton, Minister for Education and Skills of Ireland, 2016–2018; Deputy Leader of Fine Gael, 2002–2010
 Kofi Abrefa Busia, Prime Minister of Ghana, 1969–1972
 Mark Carney, Governor of the Bank of England, 2013–present; former Governor of the Bank of Canada, 2008–2013
 Donald Chapman, Baron Northfield, Member of Parliament for Birmingham, Northfield
 Gamani Corea, former Secretary-General of the United Nations Conference on Trade and Development and Under-Secretary-General of the United Nations
 Barun De, Chairman, West Bengal Heritage Commission, India, 2008–2011
 Harold Edwards, Member of the Australian House of Representatives for the Division of Berowra
 John Fforde, Chief Cashier of the Bank of England, 1966–1970
 Geoff Gallop, former Premier of Western Australia, 2001–2006
 Patricia Hewitt, British Secretary of State for Health 2005–2007
 Kamal Hossain, former Law Minister and Foreign Minister of Bangladesh
 Austin Mitchell, Labour Member of Parliament, 1977–2015
 Derek Morris, former Chairman of the UK Competition Commission
 Gus O'Donnell, Baron O'Donnell, Cabinet Secretary and Head of the Home Civil Service, 2005–2011
 Prabhat Patnaik, Deputy Chairman, Kerala Planning Commission, India
 Muhammad Habibur Rahman, Chief Justice of Bangladesh, 1995
 Manmohan Singh, Prime Minister of India, 2004–2014
 Robert Skidelsky, Member of the House of Lords 
 Norman Warner, Baron Warner, life peer and former minister and civil servant
 John Fingleton, former head, Office of Fair Trading, 2005-2012

Academics 
Franklin Allen, Professor of Finance and Economics at the Wharton School
Patrick Baert, Professor of Social Theory at the University of Cambridge
James Belich, Beit Professor of Commonwealth History, University of Oxford
Jagdish Bhagwati (1957), University Professor at Columbia University
Vernon Bogdanor, Research Professor, Institute for Contemporary British History, King's College London
Simon Caney, Professor of Political Theory, Magdalen College, Oxford
Colin Crouch, Emeritus Professor at the International Centre for Governance and Public Management, University of Warwick
John Curtice, Professor of Politics, University of Strathclyde
Huw Dixon, Professor of Economics, Cardiff Business School
Martin Feldstein, George F. Baker Professor of Economics, Harvard University
John Flemming, Warden of Wadham College, Oxford, 1993–2003
Amelia Fletcher, Chief Economist, Office of Fair Trading, 2001–2013, and singer-songwriter
Sir Lawrence Freedman, emeritus professor of war studies at King's College London; member of the Iraq Inquiry
Norman Geras, Professor Emeritus of Government, University of Manchester, UK
Alan Gilbert, Vice-Chancellor of the University of Manchester, UK
Leslie Green, Professor of Philosophy of Law, Oxford University
Jerry A. Hausman, John and Jennie S. MacDonald Professor of Economics at Massachusetts Institute of Technology
Gareth Stedman Jones, historian of England
John Kay, British economist and columnist
Ruth Kinna, Professor of Political Theory, Loughborough University
Jonathan Levin, American economist; Dean of the Stanford Graduate School of Business, 2016–
Barry Nalebuff, Milton Steinbach Professor of Management, SOM, Yale University
Gyanendra Pandey, Professor of History, Emory University
Neil Shephard, Professor of Economics and of Statistics, Harvard University
Hyun Song Shin, Hughes-Rogers Professor of Economics, Princeton University
Richard Smethurst, Provost of Worcester College, Oxford
Susan J. Smith, Mistress of Girton College, Cambridge and Honorary Professor of Social and Economic Geography at the Department of Geography, University of Cambridge
Nicholas Stern, Baron Stern of Brentford, President of the British Academy; former World Bank Chief Economist and author of the Stern Review
Rick Trainor, Principal of King's College London
Sir Alan Walters, British economist
Sharon White, British economist
Martin Wolf, chief economics correspondent of the Financial Times

Fellows 
A more complete list is available at :Category:Fellows of Nuffield College, Oxford

 Bob Allen, economic historian
 Sir Tony Atkinson, economist
 Martin Browning, economist
 Sir David Butler, politics
 Sir David Cox, statistics
 Jean Floud, sociologist, fellow (1962–1971)
 Diego Gambetta, sociologist
 John Goldthorpe, sociologist
 Anthony Heath, sociologist
 Peter Hedstrom, sociologist
 Sir David Forbes Hendry, economist
 Paul Klemperer, economist
 David Miller, political philosopher
 Sir Stephen Nickell, economist
 Dame Margery Perham, African affairs, first woman fellow (1939—1963)
 Tom Snijders, statistician

Former fellows 
 Andrew Adonis, Baron Adonis, former Secretary of State for Transport
 Brian Barry
 Hugh Clegg
 Swapan Dasgupta, Indian journalist and Member of Parliament; Junior Research Fellow
 Taslim Olawale Elias, former President of the International Court of Justice
 Martin Feldstein, now an honorary fellow
 W. M. Gorman
 Michael Herman, founder of the Oxford Intelligence Group
 Sir John Hicks, Nobel in Economics, died in 1989
 Sir James Mirrlees, Nobel in Economics, now an emeritus fellow
 Michael Oakeshott
 Avner Offer
 John Plamenatz, Research Fellow, 1951–1967
 Ariel Rubinstein, now an honorary fellow
 Amartya Sen, Nobel in Economics, now an honorary fellow
 Manmohan Singh, now an honorary fellow
 Sir John Vickers, British economist and chair of the Independent Commission on Banking

References

Nuffield College
People associated with Nuffield College, Oxford